This is a season-by-season list of National Football League players who have led the regular season in rushing touchdowns. Although rushing has both an offensive and a defensive meaning, this list charts offensive rushing touchdowns, usually scored by a running back, either a halfback or a fullback.

Record-keeping for rushing touchdowns began in 1932, when Bronko Nagurski of the Chicago Bears led the league with 4 rushing touchdowns. Since then, LaDainian Tomlinson has set the record for rushing touchdowns in a season, when he led the league in 2006, with 28 rushing touchdowns, while playing with the San Diego Chargers. Prior to Tomlinson's setting of the record, Priest Holmes of the Kansas City Chiefs and Shaun Alexander of the Seattle Seahawks, jointly held the record with 27, reaching that mark in 2003 NFL season and 2005, respectively.

Jim Brown holds the record for most league-leading seasons in rushing touchdowns, with 5 (1957, 1958, 1959, 1963, and 1965). Dutch Clark became the first player to lead the league in consecutive seasons (1936 and 1937), although in 1937 he co-led the league. The first sole rushing touchdowns leader in consecutive seasons was Johnny Drake, when he led in 1939 and 1940. Steve Van Buren was the first to lead the league in 3 consecutive seasons, from 1947–1949, a figure later matched by Jim Brown (1957–1959) and Leroy Kelly (1966–1968). Marcus Allen is the only player in NFL history to lead the league in rushing touchdowns while playing with 2 different teams; in 1982, Allen led the league while playing with the Oakland Raiders, and in 1993, he led the league while playing with the Kansas City Chiefs.

In 1943, while playing for the New York Giants, Bill Paschal became the first NFL player to rush for 10 or more touchdowns in a single season. 40 seasons later, in 1983, John Riggins became the first player to rush for 20 or more touchdowns in a single season. Steve Van Buren was the first player to lead the league with consecutive 10+ rushing touchdowns seasons, in 1947 and 1948; he would add a third consecutive in 1949. Emmitt Smith posted the first consecutive league-leading 20+ rushing touchdowns seasons in 1994 and 1995–an achievement later matched by Priest Holmes, in 2003 and 2004.

List
The following is the season-by-season listing:

Other rushing touchdowns leaders

See also
 List of National Football League career rushing touchdowns leaders

References

Rushing touchdowns leaders
National Football League lists